Shushanovka is a rural locality (a selo) in Stalsky Selsoviet, Kizilyurtovsky District, Republic of Dagestan, Russia. The population was 1,854 as of 2010. There are 30 streets.

Nationalities 
Kumyks and Avars live there.

Geography 
Shushanovka is located 55 km northwest of Makhachkala. Stalskoye and Kulzeb are the nearest rural localities.

References 

Rural localities in Kizilyurtovsky District